Nana Poku (born 1 September 1992) is a Ghanaian professional footballer who plays as a forward for TRAU in the I-League.

Career
In the 2010–11 season, Nana Poku won the "Goal King" award in the Ghana Premier League with 16 goals for Berekum Arsenal. In 2014, he signed a three-year contract with Egyptian club Ittihad El Shorta, which followed spells with Ashdod and Hapoel Kfar Saba (loan) in Israel. In 2015, Poku joined fellow Egyptian team Misr Lel-Makkasa before subsequently joining UAE Arabian Gulf League side Al Shabab at the end of 2016.

Poku's contract at Zamalek was terminated on 29 June 2018 after reaching a mutual agreement.

In 2022, Poku moved to India and signed with I-League club TRAU. He made his league debut on 15 November in their 1–1 draw against Aizawl.

Career statistics

Club

Honours
Zamalek
 Egypt Cup: 2017–18

Individual
"Goal King" Award – Ghana Premier League: 2010–11

References

1992 births
Living people
Ghanaian footballers
Association football forwards
Berekum Arsenal players
F.C. Ashdod players
Hapoel Kfar Saba F.C. players
Ittihad El Shorta SC players
Misr Lel Makkasa SC players
Al Shabab Al Arabi Club Dubai players
Al-Wakrah SC players
Al-Markhiya SC players
Ghana Premier League players
Israeli Premier League players
Liga Leumit players
Egyptian Premier League players
UAE Pro League players
Qatari Second Division players
Expatriate footballers in Israel
Expatriate footballers in Egypt
Expatriate footballers in the United Arab Emirates
Ghanaian expatriate sportspeople in Israel
Ghanaian expatriate sportspeople in Egypt
Ghanaian expatriate footballers
Expatriate footballers in Qatar
Dewa United F.C. players
Ghana Premier League top scorers
TRAU FC players